University colleges in Denmark are called professionshøjskoler (literal translation: professional college). Danish university colleges offer profession specific tertiary education, also known as medium higher education (MVU) and diploma courses, but do not offer university education at postgraduate level. For a full overview of institutions of higher education in Denmark, see List of universities and colleges in Denmark.

Danish university colleges offer courses that can lead up to a bachelor's degree. Some university colleges also offer individual short higher education (KVU).

History 
In July 2007, the Danish Parliament passed a new law regarding the Danish university colleges. The Ministry of Education under Section 50 of the Act on university colleges established the following eight colleges, which were established in January 2008: University College of Northern Denmark, VIA University College, University College Lillebaelt, West Jutland University College, University College South, University College Sealand, University College Capital, Metropolitan University College.

Notes

References